Kluba Sporta Orekhovo, generally abbreviated to KS Orekhovo or KSO was a Russian football team established in Orekhovo in 1909 by two brothers from England, Clement and Harry Charnock.

References

See also
FC Znamya Truda Orekhovo-Zuyevo

Defunct football clubs in Russia
Association football clubs established in 1909
Year of disestablishment missing
Pokrovsky Uyezd